Nicholas Hammond (born 15 May 1950) is an American-born Australian actor and writer who is best known for his roles as Friedrich von Trapp in the film The Sound of Music and as Peter Parker/Spider-Man in the 1970s television series The Amazing Spider-Man. He also appeared in the theatrical films as Spider-Man and its two sequels outside of North America.

Early life
Hammond was born on May 15, 1950 in Washington, D.C., the son of Colonel Thomas West Hammond, Jr. by his wife Eileen Hammond (née Bennett). While Hammond's father was a U.S. citizen and an officer in the U.S. Army, his mother was English and had played a role in Much Too Shy in 1942. Hammond has one elder brother, David (b. 1946). Hammond's parents had met and married in London during World War II when his father had been posted there. After the war, the couple moved to the U.S. permanently, and because the Colonel had an army job, the family moved numerous times to various army stations across the country during Hammond's childhood. Col. Hammond died in 1970.

Career
Hammond was 11 years old when he made his acting debut in the Broadway play The Complaisant Lover in 1961. At the same time, he began to shoot for the 1963 film Lord of the Flies, which marked his film debut. After this, Hammond played what was to be his most notable screen role: Friedrich von Trapp (the elder of the two boys) in the 1965 hit The Sound of Music.

Hammond's next acting role came in 1970, when he appeared in Conduct Unbecoming, his first role as an adult. In 1972 Hammond appeared as Peter Linder in Skyjacked. In 1973 he made a guest appearance on The Brady Bunch in season 4, episode #090, "The Subject Was Noses", as the high school hunk, Doug Simpson, who loses interest in Marcia after her tragic football accident. That year Hammond also appeared in The Waltons episode "The Townie", as Theodore Claypool Jr.

After making the transition from juvenile to young leading man, Hammond spent several seasons in daytime soaps such as General Hospital. He also appeared on many television shows of the 1970s including Hawaii Five-O.

In the late 1970s Hammond re-joined fellow The Sound of Music alumnus Heather Menzies (who played Louisa von Trapp) for one episode of the TV adaptation of Logan's Run. He also contributed to The Sound of Music Family Scrapbook.

Spider-Man

From 1977 to 1979, Hammond played the role for which he is perhaps best known, as Peter Parker/Spider-Man in the television series The Amazing Spider-Man. Hammond described his approach to the character: "I liked the idea of taking a fantasy hero and making him believable as a person. I made it clear going into it that I wasn't interested in doing something that was just a camp joke."

The series aired sporadically on CBS, with 13 episodes airing over two seasons. A pilot movie appeared in the fall of 1977, with the series returning as a mid-season replacement for five episodes in the spring of 1978. While the show did well in the ratings, CBS was unwilling to commit to a regular timeslot due to its relatively weak showing in the lucrative adult demographic. The second season aired six episodes, each an hour long, in the fall of 1978 and winter of 1979, with a final two-hour episode in the summer of that year. Although Hammond played Peter Parker in the television series, in all of the scenes in which Spider-Man is seen performing stunts or without dialogue, a stunt double was filmed by a second camera unit.

Later career

After the Spider-Man series ended, Hammond guest-starred on a number TV shows of the early 1980s, including The Love Boat, Magnum, P.I., Murder, She Wrote, and he played recurring roles on Falcon Crest and Dallas.

After being cast as yachtsman Dennis Conner in the 1986 Australian TV miniseries The Challenge, about the 1983 America's Cup challenge, Hammond liked the country so much that he decided to stay. He later became an Australian citizen and has since then appeared in several television miniseries filmed in Australia.

Among these was an important role as an American WWII officer based in Far North Queensland, in the major miniseries Fields of Fire, series I and II, set in the cane fields of tropical Australia. His character represented the gentler side of the culture clash between Australians and Americans. He had a starring role as Sir Ivor Creevy-Thorne in Mirror, Mirror, an Australia/New Zealand extended miniseries (a complete story of 20 serialised episodes, with cliffhangers between each of the episodes). Hammond also guest-starred in various Australian television series, including satirical television programs such as BackBerner and CNNNN, the science fiction program Farscape, and dramatic series such as The Flying Doctors, MDA and the Australian/USA co-production Mission: Impossible (which was filmed in Australia).

In 2005, Hammond portrayed television producer Aaron Spelling in Dynasty: The Making of a Guilty Pleasure, a fictionalized television movie based on the creation and behind the scenes production of Dynasty.

Hammond is a writer for Australian television, having written both the miniseries A Difficult Woman and the TV movie Secret Men's Business. In 2009, he made his directing debut with Lying Cheating Bastard, a play he co-wrote with magician James Galea.

In 2019, he portrayed director Sam Wanamaker in the Quentin Tarantino film Once Upon a Time in Hollywood.

Personal life
Hammond married Laura Soli in 1980, and the couple divorced in 1984. He moved to Australia in the mid-1980s and now lives in Sydney, with the Australian actress Robyn Nevin.

He has remained close friends with his Sound of Music siblings, several of whom joined a multitude of other actors and co-stars for the 'Save the Rose Theatre' campaign's street event, amid talent from many international productions.

Filmography

Film

Television

Theatre

References

External links

1950 births
Living people
American male child actors
American expatriates in Australia
American male film actors
American male television actors
 American people of English descent
American television writers
American male television writers
Male actors from Washington, D.C.